Periapalayam is a village about 40 km north of Chennai, in Tiruvallur district, Tamil Nadu State, India. It has one of the main routes to Andhra Pradesh.

Geography
Arani river flows through the town.

Demographics

Population 
In the 2001 Indian census Periyapalayam (Tamil Nadu, India) had a population of 5,420, of which 2,756 were male, and 2,664 were female.

In the 2011 census Periyapalayam (Tamil Nadu, India) recorded 6,749 inhabitants.

Government and politics

Civic Utility / Amenities / Services  
It has a Govt. upgraded Primary Health Center (PHC) which is behind the temple and also one Girls higher secondary school in Uthukottai Road.

Economy 
It has several big companies like Winwind in Vengal village, Pennar in Kannigaipair, Sujana industries in Manjakaranai, Hydrabad chemicals in Kannigaipair and several warehouses Like Bata India Ltd (RDC) in Periyapalyam. It also has hundreds of brick chambers.

Culture/Cityscape

Landmarks 
Bhavani Amman Temple is located in Periyapalayam.

Transport

By Air

By Rail

By Road  
Bus route 

from CMBT           --> 514, 514x, 92.
from T Nagar        --> 592, 547.
from Ambattur       --> 563.
from Thiruvallur    --> 505A.

Education

Colleges
Colleges in and around Periyapalayam are:
S.A.M.S College of Engineering & Technology (SCET) in Pannapakkam, 
Siva Institute of Technology Periyapalayam
Magna College of Engineering in Magaral
JNN college of Engineering in Kannigaipair
Southern Academy of Maritime Studies (S.A.M.S) in Panapakkam

Adjacent communities

Notes

Cities and towns in Tiruvallur district